Jüri Uustalu (31 January 1889 Voose – 25 November 1973 Haapsalu) was an Estonian politician. He was a member of Estonian Constituent Assembly. On 23 October 1919, he resigned his position and he was replaced by Nikolai Raps.

References

1889 births
1973 deaths
Estonian Social Democratic Workers' Party politicians
Members of the Estonian Constituent Assembly
Members of the Supreme Soviet of the Estonian Soviet Socialist Republic, 1940–1947
People from Lääneranna Parish